Campsidium is a genus of flowering plants belonging to the family Bignoniaceae. It has only one species, Campsidium valdivianum.

Its native range is Southern South America.

References

Bignoniaceae
Monotypic Lamiales genera
Bignoniaceae genera